Glamour is the impression of attraction or fascination that a particularly luxurious or elegant appearance creates, an impression which intensifies reality. Typically, a person, event, location, technology, or product such as a piece of clothing can be glamorous or add glamour. "Glamour" originally referred to a magic spell, an illusion said to be cast by witches.

Virginia Postrel says that for glamour to be successful it nearly always requires sprezzatura—an appearance of effortlessness, and to appear distant—transcending the everyday, to be slightly mysterious and somewhat idealised, but not to the extent it is no longer possible to identify with the person. Glamorous things are neither opaque, hiding all, nor transparent showing everything, but translucent, favourably showing things.

The early Hollywood star system in particular specialised in Hollywood glamour where they systematically glamorised their actors and actresses.

Glamour can be confused with a style, which is adherence to a particular school of fashion, or intrinsic beauty; whereas glamour can be external and deliberate.

History
"Glamour" originally referred to a magic spell, an illusion said to be cast by witches.
In the late 19th century terminology, a non-magical item used to help create a more attractive appearance gradually became known as 'a glamour'.

Late in the 19th century the common meaning shifted to being applied to ordinary objects and jewellery without connotations of supernatural, merely upon the effect that it has on appearance. This is a sense used in this article and to some extent is the way that it was used by the early Hollywood system.

In modern usage glamour is often confused with style or beauty; but they may be considered to be distinct, although glamour may give the appearance of beauty or present as a personal style.

Design
Many forms of architecture employ glamorous motifs to enhance the appearance of what may be otherwise mundane buildings. The Art Deco style is generally considered to be a glamorous one.

Cinema
The "Golden Age" of the glamour in Hollywood was the 1930s and 1940s, following the depression and its aftermath.

Hollywood studios presented their female stars in designer gowns and exquisite jewelry, both on screen and in carefully orchestrated occasions for publicity. Joan Crawford is quoted to have said, "I never go outside unless I look like Joan Crawford, the movie star."

Photography was shot in rooms that had been specially painted to flatter the skin tone of the actors and actresses, and attention was paid to hair and clothes. Notably this was successfully done with:

 Greta Garbo
 Betty Grable
 Grace Kelly
 Hedy Lamarr is quoted to have said "Any girl can be glamorous. All you have to do is stand still and look stupid."
 Sean Connery
 Marilyn Monroe

Icons
Glamour icons are people that are thought to epitomise glamour, that have an individual style that makes them more attractive.

For example:

 Caroline, Princess of Hanover, Hereditary Princess of Monaco (well-known worldwide simply as Princess Caroline of Monaco)
 Diana, Princess of Wales
 Gloria, Princess von Thurn und Taxis
 Princess Grace of Monaco
 Princess Isabelle, Countess of Paris
 Queen Elizabeth II
 Marella Agnelli
 Hope Portocarrero
 Rosalind Russell
 Cate Blanchett
 Coco Chanel
 Naomi Campbell
 Joan Collins
 Joan Crawford
 Marilyn Monroe
 Mariah Carey
 Marlene Dietrich
 Ava Gardner
 Jean Harlow
 Maria Callas
 Audrey Hepburn
 Sophia Loren
 Imelda Marcos
 Stella McCartney
 Jacqueline Kennedy Onassis
 Aishwarya Rai
 Claudia Schiffer
 Gloria Swanson
 Elizabeth Taylor
 Yvonne De Carlo
 Lana Turner 
 Mae West
 Wallis Simpson

Photography

Glamour photography is the photographing of a model with the emphasis on the model and the model's sexuality and allure; with any clothing, fashion, products or environment contained in the image being of minor consideration. Photographers use a combination of cosmetics, lighting and airbrushing techniques to produce the most physically appealing image of the model possible.

See also

 Beauty, attractiveness
 Celebutante, seeking and using fame for fame sake
 Dandy, a low-class person wearing typical high-class clothing
 Diva, theatre, cinema and music stardom
 Elegance, simple grace and dignified propriety
 Glam rock, a type of music where the musicians used outrageous glamours such as platform shoes and outrageous hairstyles
 Glamour photography, photography which shows a model, often nude or seminude
 Sprezzatura, to appear as without effort
 Style, dressing according to a school of thought

References

 Photographe de portrait glamour en Bretagne

Further reading 
 
 
 
 

Fashion